The red-pate cisticola (Cisticola ruficeps) is a species of bird in the family Cisticolidae.
It is found in Benin, Burkina Faso, Cameroon, Central African Republic, Chad, Ivory Coast, Eritrea, Ethiopia, Gambia, Ghana, Guinea-Bissau, Kenya, Mali, Niger, Nigeria, Senegal, Sierra Leone, Sudan, Togo, and Uganda.
Its natural habitats are dry savanna and swamps.

References

red-pate cisticola
Birds of Central Africa
Birds of East Africa
Red-pate cisticola
Taxonomy articles created by Polbot
Red-pate cisticola